Ralph Okerlund is an American politician and a Republican and a former member of the Utah State Senate that represented District 24 from 2009 to 2020. He was the Senate's majority leader from January 28, 2013 to 2020.

Personal life, education, and career
Okerlund earned his AA from Dixie State College (now Utah Tech University) and his BS in political science from the University of Utah. He has worked in agriculture. Okerlund is married to his wife, Cindy and they have three children.

Background
Monroe City Council 
Monroe City Mayor 
Sevier County Commissioner 
Commissioner of the Year 
President of the Utah State Association of Commissioners and Councilmen 
President of the Utah Association of Counties

Political career
Before he was a senator, Okerland was on the Monroe City Council, served as Monroe City Mayor and the Sevier County Commissioner, was president of Utah State Association of Commissioners and Councilmen, and was president of Utah Association of Counties. Senator Okerlund was elected to the Senate in 2008.

In 2016, Senator Okerlund served on the following committees: 
Executive Appropriations Committee
Executive Offices and Criminal Justice Appropriations Subcommittee
Natural Resources, Agriculture, and Environmental Quality Appropriations Subcommittee
Senate Economic Development and Workforce Services Committee
Senate Natural Resources, Agriculture, and Environment Committee 

During the 2014 General Session, Senator Okerlund was conducting a meeting with House and Senate GOP leaders when he stepped out into the hallway and apparently passed out. He said he had felt light-headed. He was not able to return for the last two days of the session.

Elections

Legislation

2016 sponsored bills 

Senator Okerlund was the Floor Sponsor for the following bills:
 H.B. 31 Enterprise Zone Amendments
 H.B. 52 Office of Outdoor Recreation Amendments
 H.B. 86 Postretirement Employment Restrictions
 H.B. 110 Election Law Changes
 H.B. 154 County Personnel Requirements
 H.B. 169 Little Sahara State Park Designation
 H.B. 217 Small School Funding
 H.B. 219 Resource Management Planning
 H.B. 266 Unclaimed Capital Credits Amendments
 H.B. 283 Public Utility Easement Amendments
 H.B. 287 Commission for the Stewardship of Public Lands and Private Donations for Public Lands Litigation
 H.B. 341 Interlocal Cooperation Act Amendments
 H.B. 479 Jail Contracting Rate Amendments
 HCR 2 Concurrent Resolution Recognizing the 40th Anniversary of the Utah Indoor Clean Air Act
 HJR 5 Joint Rules Resolution on Redistricting Standards

Notable legislation 
In 2014, Senator Okerlund sponsored S.B. 88 Substitute Child Interview Amendments, which clarifies the right of child victims to keep confidential their interviews that are conducted at a Children's Justice Center, including video and audio recordings, and transcripts of those recordings. This bill helps protect children who have suffered from abuse. It was passed and signed by the Governor.

References

External links
Official page at the Utah State Senate

Ralph Okerlund at Ballotpedia
Ralph Okerlund at the National Institute on Money in State Politics

21st-century American politicians
Utah Tech University alumni
Living people
People from Monroe, Utah
Place of birth missing (living people)
University of Utah alumni
Republican Party Utah state senators
Year of birth missing (living people)